Echo Mountain may refer to:

Echo Mountain, a mountain in California
Echo Mountain (Colorado), a mountain summit in Colorado
Echo Mountain (ski area), a ski area in Colorado
Echo Mountain (album), an album by K's Choice
Echo Mountain Recording, a professional recording studio in Asheville, NC

See also
Ekho Mountain
Echo Peak (disambiguation)